Lilburn is a small village in Northumberland, England. It is located in the on the edge of the Cheviots. The local farming estate is centred on Lilburn Tower.

The area is noted for its large number of earthworks and remains of prehistoric settlements.

Governance  
Lilburn is in the parliamentary constituency of Berwick-upon-Tweed.

References

Villages in Northumberland